The Valais Blackneck is a breed of domestic goat from the canton of Valais, in southern Switzerland, and neighbouring areas of northern Italy. The largest concentration is in the area of Visp (Viège). It is present in modest numbers in Austria and Germany.

The Valais Blackneck has a distinctive colouring, black from the nose to behind the shoulder and white from there to the tail. The English Bagot goat is similarly coloured, and has been thought to derive from this breed by descent from one presented to Richard II of England in 1387; DNA studies have shown that the Bagot originated in Spain.

Within Italy, the Vallesana is raised in the provinces of Verbania and Vercelli. It is one of the forty-three autochthonous Italian goat breeds of limited distribution for which a herdbook is kept by the Associazione Nazionale della Pastorizia, the Italian national association of sheep- and goat-breeders.

At the end of 2013 the total numbers for the breed were 3000–3400 in Switzerland and either 191 or 446 in Italy. In 2012 Austria reported 100–300 head and Germany 429.

References

Goat breeds
Dairy goat breeds
Meat goat breeds
Goat breeds originating in Switzerland